Marihuana is a 1936 exploitation film directed by Dwain Esper, and written by Esper's wife, Hildagarde Stadie.

Plot 

Burma is a confused girl who likes to party. One day she meets some strangers in a bar who invite her and her group to a party. At the party everybody drinks alcohol and the girls unknowingly smoke marijuana, which keeps them laughing. Burma and her boyfriend have sex on the beach while her friends go skinny-dipping.

One of the girls drowns at the skinny-dipping party and all her friends must keep the details of the party a secret. When Burma tells her boyfriend she's pregnant from their beach encounter, she pressures him to marry her. He says everything will be fine and turns to the strangers who threw the party for a job to support his family-to-be. The stranger gives him a job unloading smuggled drugs from a secret shipment to the docks. The police find out about this shipment, chase the smugglers, and shoot and kill Burma's boyfriend.

After Burma finds out about this news, she runs away from home, is forced to give her baby up for adoption, and becomes a drug dealer. She moves on to harder drugs, including injecting heroin into her body. In the film's ending, Burma hatches a plan to kidnap and ransom her sister's adopted daughter for $50,000, then finds out that the child is actually her own.

Cast
 Harley Wood as Burma Roberts / "Blondie"
 Hugh McArthur as Dick Collier
 Pat Carlyle as Tony Santello
 Paul Ellis as Nicholas Romero
 Dorothy Dehn as Elaine Roberts Stewart
 Richard Erskine as Morgan Stewart
 Juanita Fletcher as Mrs. Roberts
 Hal Taggart as Helen's husband
 Gloria Browne as Gloria Stewart
Uncredited
 Symona Boniface as Helen
 Marian Constance Blackton as Disapproving woman
 Horace B. Carpenter as Bartender

Production
The film's screenwriter, Hildagarde Stadie, appears as an extra in the beginning of the film.

The original trailer showed a girl being brutally attacked, but this scene does not appear in the final film.

Release
In 1938, Roadshow Attractions packaged Marihuana with the short film How to Undress in Front of Your Husband.

In an April 13, 1938, the poet Elizabeth Bishop details a Key West, Florida screening of Marihuana: "We have settled down to the summer session of banned movies — I went to 'Marihuana' last night. Several thousand Negroes, Cubans, and I, fought our way in, and then we were all very disappointed—even the two (2) thrills of the pre-view were not repeated, and the whole production was staged in what looked like a dentist's office (the 'lavish apartment of a dope-fiend'). The poor, wrecked 'high-school set' were all Hollywood matrons of at least 40, and at one point the corrupted darlings went for a nude swim—you saw little white specks way, way out in the ocean, then 'What's going on here?' and the bedraggled matrons were shown covering themselves with blankets, etc. Even from descriptions of marihuana, I thought there’d be some slow-motion work, at least."

See also
 List of films in the public domain in the United States
 Reefer Madness

References

External links

 
 
 
 

1936 films
1936 drama films
1936 in cannabis
American exploitation films
American black-and-white films
Articles containing video clips
American social guidance and drug education films
1930s exploitation films
American films about cannabis
Films directed by Dwain Esper
Anti-cannabis media
American drama films
1930s English-language films
1930s American films